The Sword/Witchcraft is a split extended play (EP) by American heavy metal band The Sword and Swedish doom metal band Witchcraft. Released on November 13, 2007 by Kemado Records, the label with which The Sword were signed at the time, it was limited to 2,500 vinyl copies.

Track listing

Personnel
The Sword tracks
J. D. Cronise – vocals, guitar, production
Kyle Shutt – guitar
Bryan Richie – bass, engineering, mixing
Trivett Wingo – drums
Witchcraft tracks
Magnus Pelander – vocals, guitar
John Hoyles – guitar, acoustic guitar
Ola Henriksson – bass
Fredrik Jansson – drums (tracks 4 and 5)
Jen Henriksson – drums (track 3)
Tom Hakava – recording, piano (track 5)
Additional personnel
Vance Kelly – artwork

References

External links
 The Sword / Witchcraft split on Discogs

2007 EPs
Witchcraft (band) albums
The Sword albums
Split EPs